Yandabo is a village on the Ayeyarwady River in Myingyan Township, central Burma. The Treaty of Yandabo which ended the First Anglo-Burmese War (1824–1826), was signed here on 24 February 1826.

References

Populated places in Mandalay Region